Lokmanya Tilak Terminus – Puratchi Thalaivar Dr. M.G. Ramachandran Central Railway Station Weekly Superfast Express is an express train of the Indian Railways connecting , Mumbai in Maharashtra and Puratchi Thalaivar Dr. M.G. Ramachandran Central railway station, Chennai of Tamil Nadu. It is currently being operated with 22179/22180 train numbers on a weekly basis.

Service 

The 22179/Lokmanya Tilak Terminus – Puratchi Thalaivar Dr. M.G. Ramachandran Central Railway Station Weekly Superfast Express has an average speed of 58 km/hr and covers 1262 km in 21 hrs 40 mins. 22180/Puratchi Thalaivar Dr. M.G. Ramachandran Central Railway Station – Lokmanya Tilak Terminus Weekly Superfast Express has an average speed of 56 km/hr and 1262 km in 22 hrs 35 mins.

Route and halts 

The important halts of the train are:

 
 
 
 
 
 
 
 
 Manthralayam Road
 
 
 
 
 
 
 
 Puratchi Thalaivar Dr. M.G. Ramachandran Central railway station

Coaches 

As is customary with most train services in India, coach composition may be amended at the discretion of Indian Railways depending on demand.

Coach composition (Downward – 22179) 

The train consists of:
 1 AC Two-tier coach (A1)
 4 AC Three-tier coaches (B1, B2, B3, B4)
 11 Sleeper coaches (S1 – S11)
 1 Pantry Car
 3 Unreserved General Sitting Coaches (GS)
 2 Generator Cars

Traction 

Both trains are hauled by an Erode based  WAP-7 electric locomotive from end to end

Notes

External links 

 11073/Mumbai LTT – Chennai Central Weekly Express
 11074/Chennai Central – Mumbai LTT Weekly Express

References 

Express trains in India
Rail transport in Maharashtra
Rail transport in Andhra Pradesh
Rail transport in Karnataka
Rail transport in Tamil Nadu
Transport in Chennai
Transport in Mumbai
Railway services introduced in 2014